Rosil Al Azawi (born January 11, 1987 in Sharjah, UAE) is an Iraqi television presenter, former model and film producer based in the United Arab Emirates.

Career
Rosil first appeared on screen at the age of 13, on a show called Salam wa kalam on Channel 4, which proved to be very successful throughout the Arab world. She has been in more than 67 successful programs on television. She's renowned for her spontaneity and free spirit on television.

Before ending her career in television, Rosil produced and presented the award-winning program Free for eight seasons on Al Sharqiya. The program aimed to bring peace to Iraq and bring all Iraqis together as one.

She also worked as production manager on an animated feature Bilal (2015 film).

References

External links
Official Site

Living people
1987 births
Iraqi television presenters
Iraqi women television presenters
Iraqi expatriates in the United Arab Emirates